Emmanuel International Canada (EICanada or EIC) is a non-governmental, non-profit, evangelical Christian relief organization. The EIC’s purpose is to strengthen and assist local churches located in developing countries to holistically meet the social, physical, emotional, and spiritual needs of their communities.

History 

Emmanuel International (EI) is Emmanuel International Canada's parent organization and was founded in 1975 by George Middleton and Dorothea Middleton, a couple who were former missionaries to Ethiopia. During the early 1970s, Ethiopia was devastated by the Wollo Famine. While the Middletons were in the country, they became aware of the practical contribution young people, together with local churches could make to eradicate the cycle of poverty, and formed EI for the purposes of putting this vision into action.

In the early days of the organization, EI was involved in sending teams of trained young people overseas to assist relief efforts in developing countries such as Ethiopia and Guatemala. The organization quickly branched out their humanitarian work to include community development and sustainability projects in countries such as Jamaica, Haiti, and Dominica. Over time, EI expanded its humanitarian efforts across the globe, and currently has active projects in 8 countries worldwide, including 5 in Africa. Since the beginning, Emmanuel International and its national offices have built a good reputation for giving hope to millions of people who were in bad situations.

EICanada was formed in 1983 as a national office of Emmanuel International. EICanada functions as a recruiting, fundraising and promotional agency for the overseas work of the whole organization.

Development Work 

The four main categories EICanada concentrates its work are: disaster relief, disaster rehabilitation, sustainable community development and Christian ministries. Through these areas of service and outreach, EICanada works with local churches to meet the specific needs of rural communities, and the needs of the whole person – social, physical, emotional and spiritual.

Notable Projects

Rainwater Harvesting Project in Tanzania 

EICanada's Rainwater Harvesting project is a part of their sustainable community development program in Tanzania. In 2007, at the request of the Anglican Diocese of Ruaha, their partner church fellowship in Tanzania, EICanada commenced construction on the project in Uhambingeto, 45 kilometres northeast of the city of Iringa in Iringa Region at the Uhambingeto pre-school and health care centre.

In Tanzania, there are two rainy seasons, a heavy season from March – May and a lighter season from November – January, with long dry seasons in between. The issue for Uhambingeto village (along with many other rural Tanzanian villages) is that there is not a local clean water source in the community. This becomes particularly problematic during the dry season, hindering the effectiveness of the community's health and education systems, and leaving the villagers vulnerable to disease and academic difficulties.

EICanada was able to implement harvesting technology that provided a collection and storage system for the rainwater so it could be used by the schools and the community when it is most needed. Rainwater is collected off of the roofs of the schools by drain pipes and stored in tanks made of cement bricks, which have attached spout stations for easy access to the supply. The group of tanks that were installed in 2007 can collectively hold a total of 70,000 litres of rainwater. EICanada taught the villagers how to make and take care of this simple technology, as well as how to use the stored water in a responsible way.

The project was successful and as a result, EICanada in partnership with the Diocese of Ruaha was able to provide the residents of Uhambingeto with a clean water source that benefitted the entire community of approximately 10,000 people. In 2010, additional rainwater harvesting tanks were installed at the primary and secondary schools of Uhambingeto, and EICanada is in the process of constructing tanks in other Tanzanian villages.

2010 Haiti Earthquake Relief Program 

EICanada has been actively working in Haiti in partnership with the Oeuvre Evangelique Baptist Bethesda (OEBB) fellowship of churches since 1978. In the immediate aftermath of the earthquake on 12 January 2010, EICanada's in-country representatives went right to work distributing relief supplies and assisting with the search and rescue efforts. Within days of the earthquake, an emergency response team was able to be sent from EICanada, under the leadership of the International Director. This emergency response team helped to network and distribute various relief supplies, including food, water and medicine, to 15,000 people at the OEBB's 10 community centres. EICanada also partnered with ShelterBox, who provided 30 tents to the OEBB, supplying 150 people with desperately needed shelter. An additional 600 tents and tarpaulins were sourced from the Dominican Republic, which were used for sheltering families and providing classroom space for needy schoolchildren. Other EICanada teams were sent to Haiti over the next few months as the relief and rehabilitation efforts continued. During the immediate aftermath of the earthquake, EICanada's donor family responded generously to the urgent need in Haiti, raising funds and donating numerous in-kind gifts of food, water, aid, supplies and medicine for the organization's relief and rehabilitation program.

In the time since the earthquake, EICanada has remained committed to helping Haitians rebuild their lives and livelihoods in the wake of the disaster, and will continue to stand by the Haitian people into the future. During the second stabilization phase of the Haiti Earthquake Relief Program (beginning on 15 April 2010, which will be an ongoing process), EICanada concentrated their rehabilitation efforts in several areas, including:

 securing vehicles for transporting supplies
 properly demolishing damaged buildings for sound reconstruction purposes
 re-opening the OEBB-sponsored primary schools
 implementing a feeding program for needy primary school students (providing 1800+ students with a properly cooked and nutritious meal at least three times weekly)
 implementing a program to supplement school fees for needy families as well as teaching salaries

The third phase of the Haiti Earthquake Relief program, which began in July 2010, is expected to take at least a few years to complete, and focuses on reconstructing damaged and/or destroyed homes, schools and churches within the OEBB network. EICanada is dedicated to supporting and seeing the OEBB and the Haitian people through this process, with a goal to help them, "move from despair to confidence and stability".

In response to the ongoing cholera outbreak, which began in October 2010, EICanada organized public health education clinics, chlorinated clean water stations, preventative hygiene kits, and stockpiles of emergency cholera treatment supplies (oral rehydration salt solution, zinc supplements, etc.) for rural areas where access to established cholera treatment centres is restricted. These initiatives have allowed EICanada to reach and provide aid for 11,000 needy Haitians.

Christian Ministry 

Emmanuel International Canada is an inter-denominational evangelical Christian organization. EICanada partners with local churches in its project countries to address and implement practical physical and spiritual solutions for the specific needs of rural communities in developing countries. EICanada's Christian ministry provides the foundation for the organization's development efforts. The organization is committed to meeting the needs of people regardless of their race, gender, age, colour or religion.

EICanada's Christian ministry projects include church planting, evangelism, leadership development, discipleship, theological education and Bible school training.

Project Countries & National Offices 

Emmanuel International has projects in 8 countries around the world: Brazil, Haiti, Malawi, South Africa, Sudan, Tanzania, Uganda and the Philippines. EI's national offices are located in Australia, Brazil, Canada (EICanada), Malawi, the Philippines, the United Kingdom and the United States.

The International Office's role is to manage, administer, and coordinate the affairs of EI around the world in cooperation with the EI national offices. The International Office shares office space with EICanada in Stouffville, Ontario, north of Toronto. The role of each national office is to manage and coordinate the work of EI in the project countries, recruit personnel and raise funds for EI-sponsored project country programs.

Fundraising 

One of EICanada's main functions as a national office is to raise funds for the purposes of financially implementing and sustaining the organization's various overseas projects.

In addition to traditional financial support for specific projects, EICanada gladly accepts relevant gifts-in-kind in partnership with donor companies, foundations, churches and individuals. EICanada also has a number of other opportunities for donors to demonstrate their support for the organization's projects, including online donations.

EICanada has a fund-matching program through the Canadian Partnership Branch of the Canadian International Development Agency (CIDA). Every CIDA-approved EICanada project receives two-thirds of the funds needed from the Canadian government to finance the project.

EICanada is a registered charity with the Canada Revenue Agency – Charity # 11889 9277 RR0001.

Memberships 

 Canadian International Development Agency (CIDA)
 EQUIP Leadership Canada
 Link Charity Canada Inc.
 Vision 2020 Canada

Anne of Green Gables 

The EICanada headquarters property in Stouffville, Ontario was one of the filming locations for the 1985 television movie Anne of Green Gables, which was based on the classic novel of the same name by Canadian author Lucy Maud Montgomery. The bridge from several key scenes in the film, including Anne's reenactment of the Lady of Shalott and the climactic scene at the end of the film when Anne and Gilbert kiss is located on the southwest side of the EICanada property overlooking the pond.

The bridge at EICanada was also used as a filming location for the film's sequel in 1987, appropriately titled, Anne of Green Gables: The Sequel. EICanada hosted a tea party in the spring of 2008 to celebrate the 100th anniversary of the novel and the organization's role in the film. The bridge continues to be an interesting attraction for visitors to EICanada and Stouffville.

References

External links 
removed for advertising
Organizations based in Ontario